Johann Heinrich Hermann "Dé" Kessler (11 August 1891 – 6 September 1943) was a Dutch football and cricket player.

Football
Kessler - along with brother Tonny and cousins Boeli and Dolf - played club football for amateur side HVV Den Haag. Kessler also won 21 caps for the Dutch national side between 1909 and 1922, scoring nine goals. After playing alongside each other in a match against England in March 1913, the Kessler brothers became the first brothers to represent the Netherlands together in an international match.

Cricket
Kessler played for the Netherlands national cricket team. He played five matches for them between 1921 and 1925, including two against the Free Foresters and one against the MCC. In August 1922 he scored a century against Ingoniti, scoring 100 not out in the second innings of the match.

References

External links
 Player profile at KNVB
 Player profile at VoetbalStats.nl

1891 births
1943 deaths
Dutch footballers
Netherlands international footballers
Dutch cricketers
People from Garut

Association footballers not categorized by position
Kessler family
Dutch people of the Dutch East Indies